Ideapod is a social media platform founded in 2013 by Mark Bakacs and Justin Brown who describe the company as a "technology company that produces media".  The company's stated mission is to, in the creators' words, "foster discussions about big ideas" and elevate the level of social discourse online and offline by allowing people to express their views and share ideas with others on matters of concern to them. Ideapod was created to enable the power of ideas to change attitudes, lives and the world, for the better. It features noted institutions such as the United Nations on its website, and is used by Jason Silva of Nat Geo's Brain Games series. Ideapod received an endorsement and assistance for funding from Richard Branson, founder of Virgin Group. As of August 2016, its user base is at 300,000.

History
Ideapod is a social media platform that was founded in 2013 by two Australian entrepreneurs named Mark Bakacs and Justin Brown. Brown stated that he felt "disillusioned" by social media websites such as Facebook or Twitter, and felt that there was too much "gratuitous information" on these websites. Brown was studying for a PhD in international politics in London, but chose to drop it for the website. He found himself in a rut in a corporate workplace, and wished to do something more impacting. Ideapod launched an invite-only beta release on February 24, 2014. Before the beta's release, Ideapod advertised that it featured "100+ influential thought leaders and 150+ leading partners, including the United Nations, and the YMCA." Ideapod has stated that it hopes to bring in a more diverse user base using this beta.

Ideapod was launched at the home of Ghislaine Maxwell, 166 East 65th Street in Manhattan, on September 19, 2013. 

Ideapod as of October 21, 2014, had 70,000 users; in 2015, they had 150,000 users. As of August 2016, Ideapod has 300,000 active users and 130,000 fans on Facebook.

Features
Ideapod, a social network for sharing and evolving ideas, allows participants to create posts which may feature URLs, images, and videos, but limits the length of their post to 1000 characters (or 40 seconds, whichever comes first). People are able to reply to others' posts and collaborate with each other. Its founders stated that they felt that a "140-character tweet" was too small for users to be able to explain "high-level concepts for solving world problems." They also have a feature that allows users to create their own content to share. Like Twitter and Facebook, Ideapod utilizes hashtags to categorize comments. The co-founders are looking to add new features as the beta continues along to increase users' abilities to collaborate and to better implement certain things. The social media site also features a thing called an "idea cluster," wherein relevant ideas from other users can be found.

Reception
Since its launch in 2014, Ideapod has received generally positive reception. VentureBeat's Harrison Weber described Ideapod as a mixture of Upworthy and Pinterest. He noted that while the Upworthy comparison is due to similarities between its headlines and Upworthy's "obnoxious title formula," he praised it for showing more "restraint with the curiosity gap." He also praised its exclusive nature. Fast Company author Vivian Giang featured Ideapod co-founder Justin Brown on her list of "the odd and surprising alternative career paths of 6 successful entrepreneurs." Editing company "The Expert Editor" announced a contest, where the person who wrote the best idea on Ideapod about their vision of the future - with the theme of "#2030" - would receive a $1000 prize. The Expert Editor stated that they chose Ideapod because it encouraged "idea-making." According to Yahoo! News, Ideapod appeared in the final six of 400 startups at the 37 Angels Pitch Forum. The Huffington Posts Melissa Jun Rowley featured discussion of Ideapod in her article about simple social networking. She felt that it was "shaping up to be a futurists' social network" and compared its desire to "create positive change" for society to Change.org. Bakacs and Brown were featured in a video series called "Men of the Moment" made by the Made Men YouTube channel to honor certain men. Other people honored include Breaking Bad creator Vince Gilligan, peace activist Carlos Arredondo, and mixologist Alex Day. B&T Magazine published an article written by Joanne Jacobs, director of 1000heads Pty Ltd, which cited Ideapod as an example of a "growing range of new social platforms that assist in product development and problem solving." Brown appeared on a panel of "innovators and disruptors" at the third-annual New York Ideas panel, which was presented by The Atlantic and the Aspen Institute at the New York Historical Society. It took place on May 6, 2014.

The website has received ideas and support from several celebrities, including Jason Silva of Nat Geo's Brain Games, best-selling author Brian Solis, and founder and chairman of the Global Partnerships Forum Amir Dossal. Silva gave praise to Ideapod, citing both its "curation" - which he feels creates better spaces for people - as well as the fact that he has seen many fans of his "Shots of Awe" series come to the website to "share awe." Dossal felt that it did well at keeping out the "noise" found in other social media websites, and that he found it "refreshing" to see so many different ideas. An interview conducted between Professor Joseph Camilleri and Bruce Kent - the latter a "leading peace and disarmament advocate" - was hosted on Ideapod. The service was officially endorsed by Sir Richard Branson, founder of Virgin Group. He described it as "offering a space where people can bounce ideas off each other." Branson helped secure $3 million in funding for Ideapod.

Indiegogo campaign

An Indiegogo campaign was initiated in order to help fund an Ideapod mobile app. It was opened on October 18, 2014, and closed on December 12, 2014. Depending on the contribution level, a person can receive early access to the website, early access to the mobile app, and a variety of content produced by members of the website. As of the close on December 12, it had made $53,613 of its $53,000 goal.

References

External links
Official Ideapod website

Online mass media companies of the United States
American social networking websites
Companies based in New York City
Computer-related introductions in 2013
Computer companies established in 2013
Internet properties established in 2013
2013 establishments in New York City